Devendrar Jayanthi is a festival celebrated annually on 11 September. It is organised by various political parties, community organisations and civil societies in Southern Tamil Nadu to commemorate the memory of Immanuvel Devendrar, a freedom fighter and Indian National Congress leader who took part in the Quit India movement during the British Raj era. He worked in the Indian Army in independent India and later he fought for the rights of depressed class people of Southern Tamil Nadu, particularly for upliftment of Pallar caste. He was a close associate of chief minister K. Kamaraj.

Political background

Immanuel Devendrar was a member of the Indian National Congress and a close associate of its leader, K. Kamaraj. At that time, Congress was supported by influential communities of southern Tamil Nadu, such as the Pallars and Nadars, and opposed by the Forward Block, which was itself favoured by the Maravar community. The two sides clashed during elections. Violence erupted notably in the districts of Ramanathapuram and Madurai which claimed over 40 lives. Devendrar was killed at this time and the anniversary of his death is today celebrated by various political parties and community organisations and civil societies as Devendrar Jayanthi.

Criticism
Devendrar Jayanti is among the celebrations sometimes criticised as being designed mainly as expressions of caste pride and political power, which sometimes turn into inter-caste violence.

These critics are rebutted by people who say that every caste has its own leader and the people are celebrating the memories of their leaders. Despite of these arguments every year the government is struggling to maintain the law and order during these celebrations.

References

Festivals in Tamil Nadu
Annual events
Unofficial observances
Anniversaries
Politics of Tamil Nadu